Pyar Ki Jeet may refer to:

Pyar Ki Jeet (1948 film)
Pyar Ki Jeet (1962 film)
Pyar Ki Jeet (1987 film)